Aleksei Aleksandrovich Ryazanov (born 21 July 1975) is a former Russian professional football player.

Club career
He played in the Russian Football National League for FC Metallurg Lipetsk in 2000.

References

1975 births
Footballers from Tambov
Living people
Russian footballers
Association football midfielders
FC Spartak Tambov players
FC Metallurg Lipetsk players